Adam Lambert (born January 29, 1982) is an American singer, songwriter and stage actor born in Indianapolis but raised in San Diego. He began performing in amateur theatrical productions in childhood, a path he pursued into adulthood, appearing in professional productions in the U.S. and abroad.

Lambert became prominent after appearing on the eighth season of American Idol. Although he was runner-up, Lambert launched a music career with the release of the studio album For Your Entertainment (November 2009) after signing with 19 in a joint venture with RCA. The album debuted at number three on the Billboard 200, sold 198,000 copies in the U.S. in its first week, and reached the top 10 in several countries worldwide. Its singles "For Your Entertainment", "Whataya Want from Me" and "If I Had You" also became international successes. Soon after the album release, he headlined a worldwide concert tour, Glam Nation, the first American Idol contestant to do so in the year following his Idol season. The tour was followed by two live releases: an extended play entitled Acoustic Live! (2010), and a live CD/DVD Glam Nation Live (2011), which debuted at number one on the SoundScan Music Video chart.  Lambert took executive producer credit and was a principal writer on his second studio album, Trespassing, released in May 2012, to critical acclaim. Trespassing made its debut in the number one spot on the Billboard 200 album chart, also topping the Billboard Digital Albums Chart and Canada's Digital Albums Chart. Lambert made music history as the first openly gay artist to achieve this top charting position.

Citing influence from various artists and genres, Lambert has a flamboyant, theatrical and androgynous performance style, and a powerful, technically skilled tenor voice with multi-octave range. He has received numerous awards and nominations, including a Grammy Award nomination for Best Male Pop Vocal Performance in 2011 as well as being named as an Honorary GLAAD Media Award recipient in 2013. By April 2012 his first album had sold nearly two million copies worldwide and 4.2 million singles worldwide as of January 2011. The Times identified Lambert as the first openly gay mainstream pop artist to launch a career on a major label in the U.S.

Awards and nominations
{| class="wikitable sortable plainrowheaders" 
|-
! scope="col" | Award
! scope="col" | Year
! scope="col" | Nominee(s)
! scope="col" | Category
! scope="col" | Result
! scope="col" class="unsortable"| 
|-
! scope="row"|Attitude Awards
| 2015
| Himself
| The Music Award
| 
| 
|-
! scope="row" | BMI Pop Awards
| 2011
|"Whataya Want From Me" 
| Award-Winning Song 
| 
| 
|-
! scope="row"|Billboard Japan Music Awards
| 2011
| Himself
| Top Pop Artist
| 
| 
|-
! scope="row" rowspan=3|Billboard.com Mid-Year Music Awards
| rowspan=3|2012
| Himself
| Best Style 
| 
| rowspan=3|
|-
| "Never Close Our Eyes"
| Best Music Video
| 
|-
| Trespassing
| Favorite Billboard 200 No.1 Album
| 
|-
! scope="row" rowspan=2|Bravo Otto Awards
| 2011
| rowspan=2|Himself
| rowspan=2| Best International Male Artist || 
| 
|-
| 2013
| 
|-
! scope="row" rowspan=3|British LGBT Awards
| rowspan=2|2015
| rowspan=3|Himself
| Music Icon Award
| 
| 
|-
| Music Artist
| 
| 
|-
| 2021
| Celebrity
| 
| 
|-
! scope="row" rowspan=2|CMA Wild and Young Awards
| rowspan=2|2010
| Himself
| Best International Male Singer || 
| rowspan=2|
|-
|"Whataya Want from Me" 
| Best International Single || 
|-
! scope="row" | Chinese Music Awards
| 2013
| Himself
| Favorite International Artist
| 
| 
|-
! scope="row" rowspan=2|Classic Rock Roll of Honour Awards
| 2014
| rowspan=2|Queen + Adam Lambert
| Band of the Year
| 
| 
|-
| 2017
| Tour of the Year
| 
| 
|-
! scope="row" |CMT Music Awards
|2016
|"Girl Crush" 
|CMT Performance of the Year 
|
|
|-
! scope="row" rowspan=2|Do Something Awards
| 2011
| rowspan="2"|Himself
| rowspan="2"| Do Something Music Artist || 
| 
|-
| 2012 
| 
| 
|-
! scope="row" rowspan=2|Dorian Awards
| 2010
| American Music Awards of 2009
| TV Musical or Comedy Performance of the Year
| 
| rowspan=2|
|-
| 2019
| "Believe" (Live at The 41st Annual Kennedy Center Honors
| TV Musical Performance of the Year
| 
|-
! scope="row"|Emma-gaala
| 2010
| Himself
| People's Choice || 
| 
|-
! scope="row" rowspan=3|Hungarian Music Awards
| 2011
|For Your Entertainment 
| rowspan="3"|International Modern Pop/Rock Album of the Year || 
| 
|-
| 2013
|Trespassing
| 
| 
|-
| 2016
| The Original High
| 
| 
|-
! scope="row" rowspan=5|GLAAD Media Awards
| 2010
| For Your Entertainment
| rowspan=2|Outstanding Music Artist || 
| 
|-
| rowspan=2|2013
| Trespassing
| 
| rowspan=2|
|-
| Himself
|Davidson/Valentini Award || 
|-
| 2020
| Velvet: Side A
| rowspan=2|Outstanding Music Artist
| 
| 
|-
| 2021
| Velvet
| 
| 
|-
! scope="row"|Grammy Awards
| 2011
| "Whataya Want from Me" || Best Male Pop Vocal Performance || 
| 
|-
! scope="row"|International Dance Music Awards
| 2010
| Himself
| Best Breakthrough Artist (Solo)
| 
| 
|-
! scope="row"|iHeartRadio Music Awards
| 2016
| Glamberts 
| Best Fan Army
| 
| 
|-
! scope="row"|MTV Video Music Awards Japan
| 2010
| "Whataya Want from Me"  
| Best Male Video
| 
| 
|-
! scope="row" |Mashable Awards
| 2011
| Himself
| Must-Follow Musician on Social Media || 
| 
|-
! scope="row" rowspan=3|Much Music Video Awards
| rowspan=2|2010
| rowspan=2|"Whataya Want from Me" 
| International Video of the Year - Artist
| 
| rowspan=2|
|-
| UR Fave International Video
|
|-
| 2011
| "If I Had You"
| MuchMUSIC.COM Most Watched Video
| 
| 
|-
! scope="row" rowspan=6|O Music Awards
| rowspan=3|2011
| rowspan=6|Himself
|Favorite F**k Yeah Tumblr
| 
| rowspan=3|
|-
| Must Follow Artist on Twitter || 
|-
| rowspan=2|Fan Army FTW || 
|-
| rowspan="2" | 2012
| 
| rowspan=2|
|-
| Must Follow Artist on Twitter || 
|-
|| 2013
| Fan Army FTW || 
|-
! scope="row"|People's Choice Awards
| 2010
| Himself
| Favorite Breakout Artist
| 
| 
|-
! scope="row" rowspan=4|Teen Choice Awards
| rowspan="3" | 2009
| American Idols LIVE! Tour 2009 || Choice Summer Tour || 
| rowspan=3|
|-
| rowspan=3|Himself || Choice Male Reality/Variety Star || 
|-
| Choice Red Carpet Icon – Male || 
|-
|2010
| Choice Music: Male Artist || 
| 
|-
! scope="row"|Young Hollywood Awards
| 2009
| Himself
| Artist of the Year
| 
| 
|-

References

Awards and nominations
Lambert, Adam